Scientific Analysis Group (SAG) is a laboratory of the Indian Defence Research & Development Organization (DRDO). Located in Delhi its primary function is to evolve  new scientific methods for design and analysis of communication systems

References

External links
 DRDO

Defence Research and Development Organisation laboratories
Research institutes in Delhi
1963 establishments in Delhi
Research institutes established in 1963